A grout curtain is a barrier that protects the foundation of a dam from seepage and can be made during initial construction or during repair. Additionally, they can be used to strengthen foundations and contain spills.

Characteristics
A grout curtain usually consists of a row of vertically drilled holes filled with pressurized grout, a process commonly known as pressure grouting.  The holes are drilled in intervals and in such a way that they cross each other, creating a curtain.

Method
Grout is injected with grouting jets, which use a high-pressure fluid stream (i.e., slurry or water) to erode a cavity in the soil.

See also
Levee
Dam failure

References

External links
Curtain Grouting the Georgetown Lighthouse
Avanti Group Case Study: Constructing Grout Curtain for Dam
Barden Ridge Dam, Sutherland, NSW - Grout Intensity Number (GIN) Method Project 
Technical Resource for Jet Grouting

Geotechnical shoring structures